Tommaso Fischer (born 11 May 2003) is an Italian professional footballer who plays as a right-back for  club Sanremese.

Club career 
Tommaso Fischer made his professional debut for Pisa SC on the 4 May 2019, coming on as a substitute in the 3–0 home Serie C win against Novara Calcio. Still aged only 15, he became the youngest ever footballer to play for the Nerazzurri.

On 22 July 2022, Fischer moved to Sanremese in Serie D.

References

External links

2003 births
Living people
Italian footballers
Association football defenders
People from Pontedera
Pisa S.C. players
S.S.D. Sanremese Calcio players
Serie C players
Sportspeople from the Province of Pisa
Footballers from Tuscany